, abbreviated as Montoku Jitsuroku, is an officially commissioned Japanese history text. Completed in 879, it is the fifth text in the Six National Histories series. It covers the years 850-858, the years of reign of the 55th Japanese sovereign, Emperor Montoku (827-858).

Background

Following the earlier national history Shoku Nihon Kōki (869), in 871 Emperor Seiwa ordered the compilation of the years since then. It was primarily edited by Fujiwara no Mototsune with assistance from Minabuchi no Toshina, Ōe no Otondo, Shimada no Tadaomi, Sugawara no Koreyoshi, Yoshibuchi no Yoshinari, and significant contributions by Miyako no Yoshika. The text was completed in 879.

Contents

Written in Kanbun-style and contained within ten volumes, the contents cover nine years of Emperor Montoku's reign spanning from 850 through 858. The text is characteristic in that it contains few political details but many obituaries for nobles.

See also

 Ruijū Kokushi, a categorized and chronological history text of the Six National Histories

External links
Text of the Nihon Montoku Tennō Jitsuroku (Japanese)
Manuscript scans, Waseda University Library

Notes

References
 
 

Late Old Japanese texts
9th-century history books
History books about Japan
9th century in Japan
9th-century Japanese books
History books of the Heian Period